Krosno Odrzańskie  is a city on the east bank of Oder River, at the confluence with the Bóbr. The town in Western Poland with 11,319 inhabitants (2019) is the capital of Krosno County. It is assigned to the Lubusz Voivodeship (since 1999), previously part of Zielona Góra Voivodeship (1975–1998).

History
The town was first mentioned as Crosno in 1005, when Duke Bolesław I Chrobry of Poland had a fortress built here in the course of his armed conflict with Emperor Henry II and the West Slavic Veleti confederation. Due to its strategic location as a point of passage across the Oder, it played an important role at the western border of the Polish kingdom with the Holy Roman Empire during the 11th to 13th centuries. In 1163 Krosno was part of the Duchy of Silesia ruled by Bolesław I the Tall of the Silesian Piasts at Wrocław. In 1201 it received its town charter by Bolesław's son Duke Henry I the Bearded. Henry erected a stone castle at Krosno, where he died in 1238 and where his widow, Hedwig of Andechs, took refuge during the 1241 Mongol invasion of Europe. When the Duchy of Wrocław was finally divided in 1251, the town became part of the newly created Duchy of Głogów under Konrad I.

The town changed hands several times; once it was given as payment to soldiers of the Ascanian margraves of Brandenburg. When the last Piast duke Henry XI of Głogów died without issue in 1476, his widow Barbara of Brandenburg, daughter of Elector Albert Achilles of Brandenburg, inherited the territory of Crossen. The Brandenburg influence met with fierce opposition by Henry's cousin Duke Jan II the Mad of Żagań, who devastated Krosno but in 1482 had to sign an agreement with Albert Achilles, who was able to retain the Krosno area. As a former part of the Duchy of Głogów it officially remained a lien of the Bohemian kingdom until in 1538 King Ferdinand I of Habsburg, renounced all rights to Crossen in 1538, thereby finalizing the district's belonging to the Neumark region of the Brandenburg margraviate.

With Brandenburg, Crossen became part of the Kingdom of Prussia in 1701. In reforms after the Napoleonic Wars, the town became part of the Province of Brandenburg in 1815 and was the seat of Landkreis Crossen as part of Regierungsbezirk Frankfurt . As a result of the Unification of Germany, it became part of the German Empire in 1871. In May 1886 the town was devastated by a whirlwind.

In 1945 during World War II, the town was conquered by the Soviet Red Army. After Germany's defeat in the war, the town once again became part of Poland, being east of the Oder–Neisse line.

Notable people
Georg Wenzeslaus von Knobelsdorff (1699–1753) German painter and architect
 Johann Friedrich Schönemann (1704–1782), German theater director
Alexander von Knobelsdorff (1723–1799), Prussian field marshal
Christiane Becker-Neumann (1778–1797), German actress
Eduard Seler (1849–1922), German anthropologist, archaeologist, philogian, and Mesoamerica scholar
Rudolf Pannwitz (1881–1969), German author
Hans Egidi (1890–1976), president of the Federal Administrative Court of Germany
Alfred Henschke ps. Klabund (1890–1928), German author
Siegfried Müller aka Kongo-Müller (1920–1983), German mercenary
Aneta Konieczna (born 1978), canoe racer, Olympic medallist
Tomasz Kuszczak (born 1982), footballer

Twin towns – sister cities
See twin towns of Gmina Krosno Odrzańskie.

References

External links
Official town website
Jewish Community in Krosno Odrzańskie on Virtual Shtetl

Cities and towns in Lubusz Voivodeship
Krosno Odrzańskie County